Norra Real ("Northern Real") is an upper-secondary school, located on Roslagsgatan 1 in Stockholm, Sweden. The school is the oldest upper-secondary school in Stockholm and one of the most difficult to get accepted into.

A number of prominent researchers and Swedish socialites have attended the school, including Manne Siegbahn (Nobel Prize laureate in Physics), Gunnar Myrdal (Nobel Prize laureate in Economic Sciences), Horace Engdahl (permanent secretary of the Swedish Academy from 1999 to June 2009), and Leif G. W. Persson (criminologist and novelist).

History
The school opened on August 29, 1876, the principal being 29-year-old Sixten von Friesen, who would later on be known for his great success in politics. At the time, the school was known as Stockholms Realläroverk but would later on change its name to Norra Real in connection with the change of facilities in 1890. At the time, the school consisted of 3 teachers and 44 students.

Building
The architect Per Emanuel Werming drew the new school building which was being finished in 1888–1891. Apart from the main building which has five floors, the school also has a house for gymnastics, and a parking garage.

Sculpture
On Norra Real's entrance floor stands a duplicate of the sculpture 'Flores and Banzeflor'. Originally the sculpture was made in bronze by the olympic prize-winner Stig Blomberg, but the replica consists of plaster. It depicts a boy and a girl, each riding a horse in the nude, and this has become a central place for the traffic of the school. The statue is commonly referred to as "Hästarna" (the Horses). For instance, one could hear "Let's meet up at Hästarna in five minutes."

Student union
Founded in 1999, the Student union at Norra real aims to enhance the school experience for members and retain (among other) academic and social interests of students. Events organized by the Student union include freshers week, assassins guild, association days and prom. The organisation has a good national reputation.

Presidents of the Student body at Norra real:

Notable alumni
 Manne Siegbahn, physicist. Winner of Nobel Prize in Physics for his discoveries and research in the field of X-ray spectroscopy. Father of Nobel Prize winner Kai Siegbahn.
 Lars Gyllensten, author and physician. Member of the Swedish Academy.
 Helge von Koch, mathematician. Gave his name to Koch snowflake.
 Gunnar Myrdal, economist, politician and Nobel Prize winner. Married to Nobel Peace Prize winner, Alva Myrdal.
 Nils Strindberg, photographer. Member of S. A. Andrée's Arctic balloon expedition of 1897.
 Jonas Gardell, novelist and playwright.
 Horace Engdahl, former permanent secretary of the Swedish Academy.
 Leif GW Persson, novelist.
 Göran Liljestrand, pharmacologist, known for the discovery of the Euler-Liljestrand mechanism.
 Claes Elfsberg, television journalist.

See also

Education in Sweden
Kungsholmens gymnasium
Södra Latin
Norra Latin

References

External links
 
Stockholm's inner-city upper secondary schools at the turn of the 20th century 

Gymnasiums (school) in Sweden
Education in Stockholm
International schools in Sweden
Schools in Sweden
Schools in Stockholm